Lazar "Laza" Lazarević (13 May 1851 – 10 January 1891) was a Serbian writer, psychiatrist, and neurologist.

Medical career

Lazarević was born in Šabac in 1851. He studied medicine at the University of Berlin Medical School. After graduating, he became a physician in Belgrade and in 1881, he was appointed Head Doctor and Chief of the Internal Department of the General State Hospital in Belgrade. Later, he became King Milan Obrenović IV's personal doctor. As a physician, he made significant contributions to the development of medicine in Serbia. He published 72 medical and scientific papers, particularly on diseases targeting the nervous system. The first cataracts operation in Serbia was performed by Lazarević and in 1884 he was the first doctor to be sent as an envoy to Austria to learn about animal lymphatic systems. He founded the first modern geriatric hospital. He participated as a field doctor in the Serbo-Turkish War of 1876 and 1878 and he was a major organizer of the Great Reserve Hospital in Niš during the Serbo-Bulgarian War of 1885, initially as medical major and then vice-colonel.

Writing
In addition to his native Serbian, Lazarević was fluent in Russian, French and German. Although he was a doctor by profession, writing took up a great deal of his time. He published nine short stories. His early writings were influenced by the socialist ideals of Svetozar Marković before shifting to a more conservative position. Despite the small body of work, his stories have been analyzed for their artistic and social contexts. His contributions to Serbian literature are significant.

He was a member of several Serbian Learned Societies, including SANU and his works were translated into numerous languages.

Legacy
He is included in The 100 most prominent Serbs and he was elected a member of Parnassos Literary Society.

See also
 Jovan Jovanović Zmaj
 Julije Bajamonti
 Vladan Đorđević
 Miodrag Pavlović
 Milan Savić
 Vladan Radoman

Works
 Prvi put s ocem na jutrenje, 1879
 Školska ikona, 1880
 Na bunaru, 1880
 U dobri čas hajduci, 1880
 Verter, 1881
 Švabica, 1881
 Sve će to narod pozlatiti, 1882
 Šest pripovedaka, 1886
 Vetar, 1888
 On zna sve, 1890
 Pripovetke L. K. Lazarevića I,  1898
 Pripovetke L. K. Lazarevića II, 1899

References

Sources
 Jovan Skerlić, Istorija Nove Srpske Književnosti / History of New Serbian Literature (Belgrade, 1921), pp. 378–384.

External links

 "New bibliography of scientific papers by Dr. Laza K. Lazarević", Kanjuh Vladimir, Pavlović Budimir, Glas SANU – Medicinske nauke, 2002, issue 46, pages 37–51
 
 Autobiografsko u prozi Laze K.Lazarevica, Ivana Zecevic, Cigoja, Beograd,2010

1851 births
1891 deaths
Writers from Šabac
Serbian psychiatrists
Serbian translators
Translators from Russian
Belgrade Higher School alumni
University of Belgrade Faculty of Law alumni
19th-century deaths from tuberculosis
Burials at Belgrade New Cemetery
Tuberculosis deaths in Serbia
19th-century translators